Jabdaraq (also known as Jidaragh and Jīdaraq) is a village in Dasht Rural District of the Central District of Meshgin Shahr County, Ardabil province, Iran. At the 2006 census, its population was 2,460 in 521 households. The following census in 2011 counted 2,494 people in 652 households. The latest census in 2016 showed a population of 2,441 people in 698 households; it was the largest village in its rural district.

References 

Meshgin Shahr County

Towns and villages in Meshgin Shahr County

Populated places in Ardabil Province

Populated places in Meshgin Shahr County